Bottin (Guglielmo Bottin, born 1977) is an Italian composer, producer, DJ and music scholar, based in Venice, Italy.

His tracks have a clear italo disco and retro-futurist electronic music influences. Before moving to contemporary space disco, he was signed to Italians Do It Better by Johnny Jewel via MySpace in 2008. Bottin was also part of the early synthwave scene playing at Valerie Collective parties and producing remixes for Jupiter. In 2009 he released Horror Disco, a concept album that fused nu disco, cosmic disco and Italian giallo movies soundtracks. In 2014, he collaborated with Steve Strange and Visage on the song Poison Within.
Bottin recently contributed to the soundtrack of Mona Lisa and the Blood Moon by Ana Lily Amirpour.

Selected discography
Eye-BM LP (2022, Slow Motion, DE)
Quality Time LP (2021, Lacerba, IT)
Love Life/Delta Tigre (2021, Artifact, NL)
Respiraré / Waterland EP (2019, Artifact, NL)
I Have What I Gave album (2017, 2MR, US)
Cristalli Liquidi album (2017, Bordello A Parigi, NL)
Arreboles EP (2017, Chit Chat, US)
Deardrums album (2017, 2MR, US)
Robottin EP with Alexander Robotnick (2015, Hot Elephant Music)
Punica Fides album (2014, Bear Funk, UK)
Sage comme un Image single (2012, ZR Records, UK)
Discocracy / August EP (2010, Eskimo Recordings, BE)
Discoursive Diversions collected remixes (2010, Nang, UK)
Horror Disco album (2009, Bear Funk, UK)
No Static single (2009, Italians Do It Better, US)
Fondamente Nove single (2008, Eskimo Recordings, BE)
I Love Me Vol. I (2004, Irma/Sony, IT)
Chill Reception album as Bluecat (2002, Irma/Sony, IT)
Good Morning Sunshine single as Bluecat (1999, Irma/Sony, IT)

Selected remixes
Museum Of Love: In Infancy (DFA, US)
Visage: Never Enough (Blitz Club, UK)
Time & Space Machine: Set Phasers To Stun (Tirk, UK)
Patty Pravo: Bambola (Vendetta Records, ES)
Solarstone: Electric Love (Solaris, UK)
Lindstrøm: Paaskelyd (Bear Funk, UK)
Sally Shapiro: My Fantasy (Permanent Vacation, DE)
In Flagranti: Ex Ex Ex" (Codek, USA)
Ali Love: Smoke And Mirrors (Back Yard, UK)
Pollyn: I Can't Get into It (unsigned USA)
Lost Valentinos: Nightmoves (EtcEtc, AUS)
Space: Carry On Turn Me On (Nang, UK)
Space: Tango in Space (Nang, UK)
Oscar G. & Stryke: Hypnotized (Hooj Choones, UK)
Solange: Robots Are Dub-American (Italians Do It Better, USA)
Tosca: Elektra Bregenz (G-Stone, Austria)
Jupiter: Starlighter (Endless Summer Recordings, France)
The Emergency: Fantasy (Metal Postcard, USA)

Installations
House of Gonzaga: La Celeste Galeria (Palazzo Te, Mantua, 2002)
Tazio Nuvolari: Tra la Terra e il Cielo (Palazzo Te, Mantua, 2003)
From Chaos to Order and Back: an exhibition by Fabrica (GGG, Osaka)
Venice Biennale 2005, Spanish Pavilion by Antoni Muntadas
Speak Truth To Power – Italian adaptation (2004, 2006)
Sciame 1, with Francesco Meneghini – Daydream Fields Replay Foundation, 2008) finalist at Share Prize 2009, Turin

References

External links
Official website
Bottin on Discogs
Academic research in musicology
Pitchfork review
Bottin and Simonetti obsess over italo disco

1977 births
Living people
Italian DJs
Musicians from Venice
Electronic dance music DJs